

Current sporting seasons

American football 2011

National Football League
NCAA Division I FBS
NCAA Division I FCS

Auto racing 2012

World Rally Championship

Basketball 2012

NBA
NCAA Division I men
NCAA Division I women
Euroleague
EuroLeague Women
Eurocup
EuroChallenge
ASEAN Basketball League
Australia
France
Germany
Greece
Israel
Italy
Philippines
Commissioner's Cup
Russia
Spain
Turkey

Cricket 2012

Australia:
Sheffield Shield
Ryobi One-Day Cup

Football (soccer) 2012

National teams competitions
2014 FIFA World Cup qualification
UEFA Women's Euro 2013 qualifying
International clubs competitions
UEFA (Europe) Champions League
UEFA Europa League
UEFA Women's Champions League
Copa Libertadores (South America)
CONCACAF (North & Central America) Champions League
OFC (Oceania) Champions League
Domestic (national) competitions
Australia
England
France
Germany
Iran
Italy
Portugal
Russia
Scotland
Spain

Ice hockey 2012

National Hockey League
Kontinental Hockey League
Czech Extraliga
Elitserien
Canadian Hockey League:
OHL, QMJHL, WHL
NCAA Division I men
NCAA Division I women

Rugby union 2012

Heineken Cup
Amlin Challenge Cup
Aviva Premiership
RaboDirect Pro12
LV= Cup
Top 14
Sevens World Series

Snooker 2012

Players Tour Championship

Tennis 2012

ATP World Tour
WTA Tour

Volleyball 2012

International clubs competitions
Men's CEV Champions League
Women's CEV Champions League

Winter sports

Alpine Skiing World Cup
Biathlon World Cup
Bobsleigh World Cup
Cross-Country Skiing World Cup
Freestyle Skiing World Cup
Luge World Cup
Nordic Combined World Cup
Short Track Speed Skating World Cup
Skeleton World Cup
Ski Jumping World Cup
Snowboard World Cup
Speed Skating World Cup

Days of the month

February 29, 2012 (Wednesday)

Basketball
Euroleague Top 16, week 6 (teams in bold advance to the quarterfinals):
Group G: 
UNICS Kazan  63–68  Panathinaikos
EA7 Emporio Armani  85–72  Fenerbahçe Ülker
Standings: Panathinaikos 4-2, UNICS Kazan, EA7 Emporio Armani 3-3, Fenerbahçe Ülker 2-4.
Group H:
Žalgiris Kaunas  71–77  Bennet Cantù
FC Barcelona Regal  70–67  Maccabi Tel Aviv
Standings: FC Barcelona Regal 6-0, Maccabi Tel Aviv, Bennet Cantù 3-3, Žalgiris Kaunas 0-6.

Football (soccer)
2014 FIFA World Cup qualification (AFC) Third Round (teams in bold qualify for Fourth Round):
Group A:
 3–1 
 7–1 
Standings: Iraq 15 points, Jordan 12, China PR 9, Singapore 0.
Group B:
 2–0 
 4–2 
Standings: South Korea 13 points, Lebanon 10, Kuwait 8, United Arab Emirates 3.
Group C:
 1–1 
 0–1 
Standings: Uzbekistan 16 points, Japan 10, North Korea 7, Tajikistan 1.
Group D:
 4–2 
 2–0 
Standings: Australia 15 points, Oman 8, Saudi Arabia 6, Thailand 4.
Group E:
 10–0 
 2–2 
Standings: Iran 12 points, Qatar 10, Bahrain 9, Indonesia 0.
Friendly internationals (top 10 in FIFA World Rankings):
(1)  5–0 
(2)  1–2 
(5)  2–3 (3) 
 1–1 (4) 
 0–0 (6) 
(8)  0–1 
(9)  1–3 
(10)  0–2

February 28, 2012 (Tuesday)

Football (soccer)
Friendly internationals (top 10 in FIFA World Rankings):  1–2 (7)

February 27, 2012 (Monday)

February 26, 2012 (Sunday)

Basketball
NBA All-Star Game in Orlando, Florida: West 152, East 149.
The West win back-to-back All-Star Games for the first time since winning three in succession between 2002 and 2004. Oklahoma City Thunder forward Kevin Durant is named as Most Valuable Player, after scoring 36 points.

Football (soccer)
 League Cup Final in London:
Cardiff City 2–2 (a.e.t) (2–3 pen.) Liverpool
Liverpool win the League Cup for the 8th time and qualify for the UEFA Europa League.

Field hockey
Men's Olympic Qualifying Tournament in New Delhi, India:
Fifth place game:  5–0 
Third place game:  3–4 
Final:  8–1 
India qualifies for the Olympics.

Mixed martial arts
UFC 144 in Saitama, Japan (USA unless stated):
Lightweight bout: Anthony Pettis def. Joe Lauzon via KO (head kick & punches)
Featherweight bout: Hatsu Hioki  def. Bart Palaszewski  via unanimous decision (29–28, 30–27, 29–28)
Middleweight bout: Tim Boetsch def. Yushin Okami  via TKO (punches)
Welterweight bout: Jake Shields def. Yoshihiro Akiyama  via unanimous decision (30–27, 30–27, 30–27)
Heavyweight bout: Mark Hunt  def. Cheick Kongo  via TKO (punches)
Catchweight (211 lb) bout: Ryan Bader def. Quinton Jackson via unanimous decision (30–27, 30–27, 30–27)
Lightweight Championship bout: Benson Henderson def. Frankie Edgar (c) via unanimous decision (49–46, 48–47, 49–46)

Tennis
ATP World Tour:
Regions Morgan Keegan Championships in Memphis, Tennessee:
Final: Jürgen Melzer  def. Milos Raonic  7–5, 7–6 (4)
Melzer wins his fourth ATP Tour title.
Open 13 in Marseille, France:
Final: Juan Martín del Potro  def. Michaël Llodra  6–4, 6–4
del Potro wins his tenth ATP Tour title.
Copa Claro in Buenos Aires, Argentina:
Final: David Ferrer  def. Nicolás Almagro  4–6, 6–3, 6–2
Ferrer wins his second title of the year and 13th of his career.
WTA Tour:
Dubai Tennis Championships in Dubai, United Arab Emirates:
Final: Agnieszka Radwańska  def. Julia Görges  7–5, 6–4
Radwańska wins her first title of the year and 8th of her career.
Memphis International in Memphis, Tennessee:
Final: Sofia Arvidsson  def. Marina Erakovic  6–3, 6–4
Arvidsson wins her second WTA Tour title, with her first title won at the same event six years ago.
Monterrey Open in Monterrey, Mexico:
Final: Tímea Babos  def. Alexandra Cadanțu  6–4, 6–4
Babos wins her first WTA Tour title.

February 25, 2012 (Saturday)

Basketball
NBA All-Star Weekend in Orlando, Florida:
Slam Dunk Contest winner: Jeremy Evans, Utah Jazz
Three-Point Shootout winner: Kevin Love, Minnesota Timberwolves
Skills Challenge winner: Tony Parker, San Antonio Spurs
Shooting Stars Competition winner: New York (Landry Fields, Cappie Pondexter and Allan Houston)

Field hockey
Women's Olympic Qualifying Tournament in New Delhi, India:
Fifth place game:  3–0 
Third place game:  2–1 
Final:  3–1 
South Africa qualifies for the Olympics.

February 24, 2012 (Friday)

Field hockey
Men's Olympic Qualifying Tournament in New Delhi, India:
 4–0 
 1–1 
 4–2 
Final standings: India 15 points, France 10, Poland 9, Canada 7, Italy 3, Singapore 0.
Women's Olympic Qualifying Tournament in New Delhi, India:
 1–0 
 4–1 
 0–1 
Final standings: South Africa 13 points, India 10, Italy 8, Ukraine 7, Canada 4, Poland 0.

February 23, 2012 (Thursday)

Basketball
Euroleague Top 16, week 5 (teams in bold advance to quarterfinals):
Group F: Real Madrid  86–65  Unicaja
Group G:
Fenerbahçe Ülker  94–87  UNICS Kazan
Panathinaikos  58–67  EA7 Emporio Armani
Group H:
Maccabi Tel Aviv  70–66  Žalgiris Kaunas
Bennet Cantù  62–63  FC Barcelona Regal

Football (soccer)
UEFA Europa League Round of 32, second leg (first leg scores in parentheses):
Athletic Bilbao  1–0 (1–2)  Lokomotiv Moscow. 2–2 on aggregate; Athletic Bilbao win on away goals.
Valencia  1–0 (1–0)  Stoke City. Valencia win 2–0 on aggregate.
Twente  1–0 (1–0)  Steaua București. Twente win 2–0 on aggregate.
Standard Liège  0–0 (1–1)  Wisła Kraków. 1–1 on aggregate; Standard Liège win on away goals.
PAOK  0–3 (0–0)  Udinese. Udinese win 3–0 on aggregate.
PSV Eindhoven  4–1 (2–1)  Trabzonspor. PSV Eindhoven win 6–2 on aggregate.
Club Brugge  0–1 (1–2)  Hannover 96. Hannover 96 win 3–1 on aggregate.
Manchester United  1–2 (2–0)  Ajax. Manchester United win 3–2 on aggregate.
Metalist Kharkiv  4–1 (4–0)  Red Bull Salzburg. Metalist Kharkiv win 8–1 on aggregate.
Olympiacos  1–0 (1–0)  Rubin Kazan. Olympiacos win 2–0 on aggregate.
Anderlecht  0–1 (0–1)  AZ. AZ win 2–0 on aggregate.
Atlético Madrid  1–0 (3–1)  Lazio. Atlético Madrid win 4–1 on aggregate.
Schalke 04  3–1 (a.e.t.) (1–1)  Viktoria Plzeň. Schalke 04 win 4–2 on aggregate.
Beşiktaş  0–1 (2–0)  Braga. Beşiktaş win 2–1 on aggregate.
Sporting CP  1–0 (2–2)  Legia Warsaw. Sporting CP win 3–2 on aggregate.
Copa Libertadores Second Stage:
Group 1: The Strongest  2–1  Juan Aurich
Group 2: Olimpia  2–1  Lanús
Group 3: Universidad Católica  2–2  Junior

February 22, 2012 (Wednesday)

Basketball
Euroleague Top 16, week 5:
Group E:
CSKA Moscow  96–64  Olympiacos
Galatasaray Medical Park  64–56  Anadolu Efes
Group F: Gescrap Bizkaia  60–59  Montepaschi Siena

Field hockey
Men's Olympic Qualifying Tournament in New Delhi, India:
 11–3 
 0–3 
 2–3 
Women's Olympic Qualifying Tournament in New Delhi, India:
 1–2 
 1–0 
 2–5

Football (soccer)
UEFA Champions League Round of 16, first leg:
Basel  1–0  Bayern Munich
Marseille  1–0  Internazionale
UEFA Europa League Round of 32, second leg (first leg score in parentheses): Manchester City  4–0 (2–1)  Porto. Manchester City win 6–1 on aggregate.
Copa Libertadores Second Stage:
Group 7: Vélez Sársfield  3–0  Guadalajara
Group 8: Universidad de Chile  5–1  Godoy Cruz
Asian Olympics Qualifiers Preliminary Round 3, matchday 5:
Group A:
 2–1 
 0–3 
Group B:  1–0 
Group C:
 2–1 
 0–4

February 21, 2012 (Tuesday)

Field hockey
Men's Olympic Qualifying Tournament in New Delhi, India:
 1–15 
 7–2 
 2–6 
Women's Olympic Qualifying Tournament in New Delhi, India:
 2–5 
 1–1 
 0–3

Football (soccer)
UEFA Champions League Round of 16, first leg:
CSKA Moscow  1–1  Real Madrid
Napoli  3–1  Chelsea
Copa Libertadores Second Stage:
Group 3: Bolívar  1–3  Unión Española
Group 4: Arsenal  3–0  Zamora
Group 6: Cruz Azul  4–0  Deportivo Táchira
Group 8: Peñarol  0–4  Atlético Nacional
Asian Olympics Qualifiers Preliminary Round 3:
Group B:  2–1

February 20, 2012 (Monday)

February 19, 2012 (Sunday)

Basketball
 Spanish Cup Final in Barcelona: FC Barcelona Regal 74–91 Real Madrid
Real Madrid win the Cup for the 23rd time.

Field hockey
Men's Olympic Qualifying Tournament in New Delhi, India:
 2–3 
 0–9 
 8–1 
Women's Olympic Qualifying Tournament in New Delhi, India:
 1–4 
 2–0 
 4–1

Football (soccer)
 CAF Champions League preliminary round, first leg:
DFC8  1–0  Les Astres
Missile  3–2  Africa Sports
AFAD Djékanou  1–0  Diables Noirs
Orlando Pirates  1–3  Recreativo do Libolo
Mafunzo  0–2  Liga Muçulmana
CD Elá Nguema  0–3  Dolphins
LISCR  0–2  Berekum Chelsea
Green Mamba  2–4  FC Platinum
Japan Actuel's  1–5  Power Dynamos
CAF Confederation Cup preliminary round, first leg: 
Dragons  1–0  Étoile Filante
AC Léopard  2–0  AS Tempête Mocaf
LLB Académic  3–0  Atlético Semu
Renaissance FC  2–0  Sahel SC
GAMTEL  1–0  Casa Sport

Golf
PGA Tour:
Northern Trust Open in Pacific Palisades, Los Angeles:
Winner: Bill Haas  277 (−7)
Haas wins his fourth PGA Tour title.
European Tour:
Avantha Masters in New Delhi, India:
Winner: Jbe' Kruger  274 (−14)
Kruger wins his first European Tour title.
LPGA Tour:
Honda LPGA Thailand in Chonburi, Thailand:
Winner: Yani Tseng  269 (−19)
Tseng wins her 13th LPGA Tour title.
Champions Tour:
The ACE Group Classic in Naples, Florida:
Winner: Kenny Perry  196 (−20)
Perry wins his second Champions Tour title.

Tennis
ATP World Tour:
ABN AMRO World Tennis Tournament in Rotterdam, Netherlands:
Final: Roger Federer  def. Juan Martín del Potro  6–1, 6–4
Federer wins his 71st ATP Tour title.
SAP Open in San Jose, California:
Final: Milos Raonic  def. Denis Istomin  7–6 (2), 6–2
Raonic wins his third ATP Tour title.
Brasil Open in São Paulo, Brasil:
Final: Nicolás Almagro  def. Filippo Volandri  6–3, 4–6, 6–4
Almagro wins his eleventh career title.
WTA Tour:
Qatar Total Open in Doha, Qatar:
Final: Victoria Azarenka  def. Samantha Stosur  6–1, 6–2
Azarenka wins her third title of the year and eleventh of her career.
Copa Sony Ericsson Colsanitas in Bogotá, Colombia:
Final: Lara Arruabarrena-Vecino  def. Alexandra Panova  6–2, 7–5
Arruabarrena-Vecino wins her first WTA Tour title.

February 18, 2012 (Saturday)

Auto racing
Sprint Cup Series:
Budweiser Shootout: (1) Kyle Busch  (Toyota) (2) Tony Stewart  (Chevrolet) (3) Marcos Ambrose  (Ford)

Field hockey
Men's Olympic Qualifying Tournament in New Delhi, India:
 9–0 
 2–1 
 15–1 
Women's Olympic Qualifying Tournament in New Delhi, India:
 2–1 
 2–2 
 1–1

Football (soccer)
AFC Champions League qualifying play-off:
Esteghlal  3–1  Al-Ettifaq
Al-Shabab  3–0  Neftchi Farg'ona
Pohang Steelers  2–0  Chonburi
OFC Champions League Group Stage, matchday 4:
Group A: Mont-Dore  0–1  Ba
Group B:
Auckland City  7–3  Koloale
Hekari United  2–0  Amicale
CAF Champions League preliminary round, first leg:
ASFA Yennenga  0–0  ASO Chlef
Young Africans  1–1  Zamalek
Ports Authority  0–0  Horoya AC
Foullah Edifice  0–0  JSM Béjaïa
Tusker  0–0  APR
Coin Nord  0–0  Ethiopian Coffee
ASGNN  0–0  Tonnerre
URA  3–0  Lesotho Correctional Services
Brikama United  0–1  US Ouakam
CAF Confederation Cup preliminary round, first leg:
Union Douala  1–0  FC Kallon
Black Leopards  1–1  Motor Action
Red Arrows  0–0  Royal Leopards
AS Mangasport  0–1  Saint-George SA
Kiyovu Sports  1–1  Simba
Ferroviário de Maputo  3–0  Gor Mahia
Séwé Sports  0–1  Unisport Bafang
Extension Gunners  2–1  TANA
Jamhuri  0–3  Hwange

February 17, 2012 (Friday)

Football (soccer)
OFC Champions League Group Stage, matchday 4: 
Group A: Tefana  3–0  Waitakere United

February 16, 2012 (Thursday)

Basketball
 Israeli State Cup Final in Tel Aviv: Maccabi Tel Aviv 82–69 Maccabi Rishon LeZion
Maccabi Tel Aviv win the Cup for the third successive time and 39th time overall.

Football (soccer)
UEFA Europa League Round of 32, first leg:
Lokomotiv Moscow  2–1  Athletic Bilbao
Red Bull Salzburg  0–4  Metalist Kharkiv
Ajax  0–2  Manchester United
Viktoria Plzeň  1–1  Schalke 04
AZ  1–0  Anderlecht
Lazio  1–3  Atlético Madrid
Legia Warsaw  2–2  Sporting CP
Steaua București  0–1  Twente
Wisła Kraków  1–1  Standard Liège
Udinese  0–0  PAOK
Trabzonspor  1–2  PSV Eindhoven
Hannover 96  2–1  Club Brugge
Porto  1–2  Manchester City
Stoke City  0–1  Valencia
Copa Libertadores Second Stage:
Group 5: Nacional  1–2  Libertad
Group 8: Godoy Cruz  1–0  Peñarol

February 15, 2012 (Wednesday)

Football (soccer)
UEFA Champions League Round of 16, first leg:
Zenit St. Petersburg  3–2  Benfica
Milan  4–0  Arsenal
Copa Libertadores Second Stage:
Group 1: The Strongest  2–1  Santos
Group 2: Lanús  1–1  Flamengo
Group 6: Deportivo Táchira  1–1  Corinthians
UEFA Women's Euro 2013 qualifying:
Group 1:  2–3 
Group 2:  0–5 
Group 3:  2–2 
Group 7:  6–0

Mixed martial arts
UFC on Fuel TV: Sanchez vs. Ellenberger in Omaha, Nebraska, United States (USA unless stated):
Bantamweight bout: Ivan Menjivar  def. John Albert via submission (rear-naked choke)
Bantamweight bout: T.J. Dillashaw def. Walel Watson via unanimous decision (30–25, 30–25, 30–26)
Heavyweight bout: Stipe Miocic def. Philip De Fries  via KO (punches)
Middleweight bout: Ronny Markes  def. Aaron Simpson via split decision (29–28, 28–29, 29–28)
Heavyweight bout: Stefan Struve  def. Dave Herman via TKO (punches)
Welterweight bout: Jake Ellenberger def. Diego Sanchez via unanimous decision (29–28, 29–28, 29–28)

Ski jumping
World Cup in Klingenthal, Germany: Cancelled due to high winds.

February 14, 2012 (Tuesday)

Football (soccer)
UEFA Champions League Round of 16, first leg:
Lyon  1–0  APOEL
Bayer Leverkusen  1–3  Barcelona
UEFA Europa League Round of 32, first leg:
Rubin Kazan  0–1  Olympiacos
Braga  0–2  Beşiktaş
Copa Libertadores Second Stage:
Group 4: Zamora  0–0  Boca Juniors
Group 7: Defensor Sporting  2–0  Deportivo Quito
Group 8: Atlético Nacional  2–0  Universidad de Chile

February 13, 2012 (Monday)

February 12, 2012 (Sunday)

Alpine skiing
Men's World Cup in Krasnaya Polyana, Russia:
Super combined: (1) Ivica Kostelić  (2) Beat Feuz  (3) Thomas Mermillod-Blondin 
Final standings: (1) Kostelić 336 points (2) Feuz 300 (3) Romed Baumann  159
Kostelić defends his combined title, and wins his fifth career discipline title.
Women's World Cup in Soldeu, Andorra:
Giant slalom: (1) Tessa Worley  (2) Tina Maze  (3) Maria Höfl-Riesch

Auto racing
World Rally Championship:
Rally Sweden: (1) Jari-Matti Latvala /Miikka Anttila  (Ford Fiesta RS WRC) (2) Mikko Hirvonen /Jarmo Lehtinen  (Citroën DS3 WRC) (3) Mads Østberg /Jonas Andersson  (Ford Fiesta RS WRC)

Biathlon
World Cup 8 in Kontiolahti, Finland:
Men's 12.5 km Pursuit: (1) Ole Einar Bjørndalen  (2) Martin Fourcade  (3) Dmitry Malyshko 
Women's 10 km Pursuit: (1) Kaisa Mäkäräinen  (2) Magdalena Neuner  (3) Darya Domracheva

Football (soccer)
Africa Cup of Nations in Equatorial Guinea and Gabon:
Final:   0–0 (8–7 pen.)  
Zambia win the title for the first time.

Golf
PGA Tour:
AT&T Pebble Beach National Pro-Am in Pebble Beach, California:
Winner: Phil Mickelson  269 (−17)
Mickelson wins his 40th PGA Tour title.
European Tour:
Dubai Desert Classic in Dubai, United Arab Emirates:
Winner: Rafael Cabrera-Bello  270 (−18)
Cabrera-Bello wins his second European Tour title.
LPGA Tour:
Women's Australian Open in Black Rock, Australia:
Winner: Jessica Korda  289 (−3)PO
Korda wins her first LPGA Tour title, in a six-player playoff.
Champions Tour:
Allianz Championship in Boca Raton, Florida:
Winner: Corey Pavin 
Pavin wins his first Champions Tour title.

Rugby union
Six Nations Championship, week 2:  27–13

Tennis
Davis Cup
World Group, first round:
 5–0 
 2–3 
 1–4 
 0–5 
 4–1 
 4–1 
 2–3 
  1–4 
WTA Tour:
Open GDF Suez in Paris, France:
Final: Angelique Kerber  def. Marion Bartoli  7–6 (3), 5–7, 6–3
Kerber wins her first WTA title.
PTT Pattaya Open in Pattaya, Thailand
Final: Daniela Hantuchová  def. Maria Kirilenko  6–7 (4), 6–3, 6–3
Hantuchová wins the tournament for the second time, and his 5th career title.

February 11, 2012 (Saturday)

Alpine skiing
Men's World Cup in Krasnaya Polyana, Russia:
Downhill: (1) Beat Feuz  (2) Benjamin Thomsen  (3) Adrien Théaux 
Women's World Cup in Soldeu, Andorra:
Slalom: (1) Marlies Schild  (2) Frida Hansdotter  (3) Kathrin Zettel

Biathlon
World Cup 8 in Kontiolahti, Finland:
Men's 10 km Sprint: (1) Martin Fourcade  (2) Timofey Lapshin  (3) Benjamin Weger 
Women's 7.5 km Sprint: (1) Magdalena Neuner  (2) Kaisa Mäkäräinen  (3) Darya Domracheva

Bobsleigh
Bobsleigh World Cup in Calgary, Canada:
Two-man: (1) Beat Hefti/Thomas Lamparter  (2) Manuel Machata/Andreas Bredau  (3) Maximilian Arndt/Kevin Kuske 
Final standings:  Hefti 1695 points  Arndt 1573  Alexandr Zubkov  1416
Hefti wins his second World Cup title.
Four-man: (1) Machata/Marko Huebenbecker/Bredau/Christian Poser  (2) Arndt/Jan Speer/Kuske/Martin Putze  (3) Zubkov/Filipp Yegorov/Dmitry Trunenkov/Maxim Mokrousov 
Final standings:  Zubkov 1671 points  Arndt 1606  Machata 1574
Zubkov wins his record-equalling fourth World Cup title.
Two-woman: (1) Kaillie Humphries/Jennifer Ciochetti  (2) Anja Schneiderheinze-Stöckel/Lisette Thöne  (3) Sandra Kiriasis/Petra Lammert 
Final standings:  Cathleen Martini  1655  Schneiderheinze-Stöckel 1598  Kiriasis 1574
Kiriasis fails to win the World Cup for the first time since 2003.

Cross-country skiing
World Cup in Nové Město na Moravě, Czech Republic:
Men's 30 km C Mass Start: (1) Johan Olsson  (2) Dario Cologna  (3) Maxim Vylegzhanin 
Women's 15 km C Mass Start: (1) Marit Bjørgen  (2) Justyna Kowalczyk  (3) Therese Johaug

Football (soccer)
Africa Cup of Nations in Equatorial Guinea and Gabon:
Third place match:  0–2

Futsal
European Men's Championship in Zagreb, Croatia:
Bronze medal match:  1–3  
Final:   1–3 (a.e.t.)  
Spain win the fourth successive title, and sixth overall.

Rugby union
Six Nations Championship, week 2:  15–19

February 10, 2012 (Friday)

Biathlon
World Cup 8 in Kontiolahti, Finland:
Mixed 2x6+2x7.5 km Relay: (1)  (2)  (3)

February 9, 2012 (Thursday)

Basketball
Euroleague Top 16, matchday 4:
Group E: Galatasaray Medical Park  68–64  CSKA Moscow
Group G: Panathinaikos  72–62  Fenerbahçe Ülker
Group H:
Žalgiris Kaunas  58–67  FC Barcelona Regal
Maccabi Tel Aviv  75–60  Bennet Cantù

Football (soccer)
Copa Libertadores Second Stage:
Group 1: Internacional  2–0  Juan Aurich
Group 2: Emelec  1–0  Olimpia
Group 3: Universidad Católica  1–1  Bolívar
Group 5: Libertad  4–1  Alianza Lima

Futsal
European Men's Championship in Zagreb, Croatia:
Semi-finals:
 2–4 
 1–0

February 8, 2012 (Wednesday)

Basketball
Euroleague Top 16, matchday 4:
Group E: Anadolu Efes  65–67  Olympiacos
Group F:
Montepaschi Siena  84–69  Unicaja
Gescrap Bizkaia  93–69  Real Madrid
Group G: EA7 Emporio Armani  63–58  UNICS Kazan

Football (soccer)
Africa Cup of Nations in Equatorial Guinea and Gabon:
Semifinals:
In Bata:  1–0 
In Libreville:  0–1 
Copa Libertadores Second Stage:
Group 3: Unión Española  2–0  Junior
Group 5: Vasco da Gama  1–2  Nacional
Group 6: Nacional  1–2  Cruz Azul

Snowboarding
World Cup in Blue Mountain, Canada:
Snowboard cross men: (1) Pierre Vaultier  (2) David Speiser  (3) Nick Baumgartner 
Snowboard cross women: (1) Dominique Maltais  (2) Aleksandra Zhekova  (3) Maelle Ricker

February 7, 2012 (Tuesday)

Baseball
Caribbean Series in Santo Domingo, Dominican Republic:
 Tigres de Aragua 6,  Yaquis de Obregón 2
 Indios de Mayagüez 3,  Leones del Escogido 1
Final standings: Leones del Escogido 4–2, Indios de Mayagüez, Tigres de Aragua 3–3, Yaquis de Obregón 2–4.
The Leones win the Caribbean Series for the first time since 2010, and the fourth time overall.

Football (soccer)
Copa Libertadores Second Stage:
Group 4: Fluminense  1–0  Arsenal
Group 7:
Defensor Sporting  0–3  Vélez Sársfield
Guadalajara  1–1  Deportivo Quito

Futsal
European Men's Championship in Croatia:
Quarter-finals:
In Split:  2–1 
In Zagreb:  3–1

February 6, 2012 (Monday)

Baseball
Caribbean Series in Santo Domingo, Dominican Republic:
 Indios de Mayagüez 4,  Yaquis de Obregón 3
 Tigres de Aragua 7,  Leones del Escogido 0

Futsal
European Men's Championship in Croatia:
Quarter-finals:
In Zagreb:  3–8 
In Split:  1–1 (3–1 pen.)

February 5, 2012 (Sunday)

American football
Super Bowl XLVI: New York Giants 21–17 New England Patriots
New York Giants win the Super Bowl for the fourth time, and first since defeating the Patriots in Super Bowl XLII.

Baseball
Caribbean Series in Santo Domingo, Dominican Republic:
 Tigres de Aragua 7,  Indios de Mayagüez 0
 Leones del Escogido 2,  Yaquis de Obregón 0

Football (soccer)
Africa Cup of Nations in Equatorial Guinea and Gabon:
Quarterfinals:
In Libreville:  1–1 (4–5 pen.) 
In Franceville:  2–1 (a.e.t.)

Futsal
European Men's Championship in Croatia (teams in bold advance to the quarter-finals):
Group C in Split:  2–2 
Standings: Russia, Italy 4 points,  0.
Group D in Zagreb:  1–2 
Standings: Portugal 6 points, Serbia 3,  0.

Handball
Asian Men's Championship in Jeddah, Saudi Arabia:
Bronze medal game:   25–21 
Final:   23–22  
South Korea win the title for the ninth time.

Tennis
Open Sud de France in Montpellier, France:
Final: Tomáš Berdych  def. Gaël Monfils  6–2, 4–6, 6–3
Berdych wins his seventh ATP Tour title. 
PBZ Zagreb Indoors in Zagreb, Croatia: 
Final: Mikhail Youzhny  def. Lukáš Lacko  6–2, 6–3
Youzhny wins his eighth ATP Tour title. 
VTR Open in Viña del Mar, Chile: 
Final: Juan Mónaco  def. Carlos Berlocq  6–3, 6–7(1), 6–1
Mónaco wins his fourth ATP Tour title, and first since 2007.

February 4, 2012 (Saturday)

Baseball
Caribbean Series in Santo Domingo, Dominican Republic:
 Yaquis de Obregón 4,  Tigres de Aragua 2
 Leones del Escogido 6,  Indios de Mayagüez 1

Equestrianism
Show jumping – World Cup, Western European League:
11th competition in Bordeaux:  Kevin Staut  on Silvana  Edwina Tops-Alexander  on Itot du Château  Rik Hemeryck  on Quarco de Kerambars
Combined driving – World Cup:
World Cup Final in Bordeaux:  Boyd Exell   IJsbrand Chardon   Koos de Ronde

Football (soccer)
Africa Cup of Nations in Equatorial Guinea and Gabon:
Quarterfinals:
In Bata:  3–0 
In Malabo:  3–0

Futsal
European Men's Championship in Croatia (teams in bold advance to the quarter-finals):
Group A in Split:  4–5 
Standings: Croatia 6 points,  3, Czech Republic 0.
Group B in Zagreb:  1–4 
Standings: Spain 6 points, Ukraine 3,  0.

Mixed martial arts
UFC 143 in Las Vegas, United States (USA unless stated):
Middleweight bout: Ed Herman def. Clifford Starks via submission (rear-naked choke)
Bantamweight bout: Renan Barão  def. Scott Jorgensen via unanimous decision (30–27, 30–27, 30–27)
Welterweight bout: Josh Koscheck def. Mike Pierce via split decision (28–29, 29–28, 29–28)
Heavyweight bout: Fabrício Werdum  def. Roy Nelson via unanimous decision (30–27, 30–27, 30–27)
Interim Welterweight Championship bout: Carlos Condit def. Nick Diaz via unanimous decision (48–47, 49–46, 49–46)

February 3, 2012 (Friday)

Baseball
Caribbean Series in Santo Domingo, Dominican Republic:
 Yaquis de Obregón 2,  Indios de Mayagüez 0
 Leones del Escogido 5,  Tigres de Aragua 2 (F/13)

Cricket
India in Australia:
2nd T20I in Melbourne:
 131 (19.4 overs);  135/2 (19.4 overs). India win by 8 wickets (with 2 balls remaining).

Futsal
European Men's Championship in Croatia:
Group C in Split:  0–5 
Group D in Zagreb:  8–9

Handball
Asian Men's Championship in Jeddah, Saudi Arabia:
Semifinals:
 27–26 
 33–28

February 2, 2012 (Thursday)

Baseball
Caribbean Series in Santo Domingo, Dominican Republic:
 Indios de Mayagüez 3,  Tigres de Aragua 1
 Leones del Escogido 2,  Yaquis de Obregón 1

Basketball
Euroleague Top 16 matchday 3:
Group E: CSKA Moscow  85–70  Galatasaray Medical Park
Group F: Unicaja  68–91  Montepaschi Siena
Group G: Fenerbahçe Ülker  56–77  Panathinaikos
Group H:
Bennet Cantù  82–74  Maccabi Tel Aviv
FC Barcelona Regal  94–80  Žalgiris Kaunas

Football (soccer)
Copa Libertadores First Stage, second leg (teams in bold advance to the Second Stage):
Caracas  1–1  Peñarol. Peñarol win 4–1 on points.
UANL  2–2  Unión Española. Unión Española win 4–1 on points.

Futsal
European Men's Championship in Croatia:
Group A in Split:  3–1 
Group B in Zagreb:  3–6

February 1, 2012 (Wednesday)

Basketball
Euroleague Top 16 matchday 3:
Group E: Olympiacos  83–65  Anadolu Efes
Group F: Real Madrid  89–73  Gescrap Bizkaia
Group G: UNICS Kazan  59–44  EA7 Emporio Armani

Cricket
India in Australia:
1st T20I in Sydney:
 171/4 (20 overs);  140/6 (20 overs). Australia win by 31 runs.

Football (soccer)
Africa Cup of Nations in Equatorial Guinea and Gabon (teams in bold advance to the quarterfinals):
Group D:
 1–2 
 1–1 
Copa Libertadores First Stage, second leg (teams in bold advance to the Second Stage):
Flamengo  2–0  Real Potosí. 3–3 on points; Flamengo win 3–2 on aggregate.
Once Caldas  2–2  Internacional. Internacional win 4–1 on points.

Futsal
European Men's Championship in Croatia:
Group C in Split:  3–1 
Group D in Zagreb:  4–1

Handball
Asian Men's Championship in Jeddah, Saudi Arabia (teams in bold advance to the semifinals):
Group A:
 28–27 
 28–31 
Group B:  29–30

References

II
February 2012 sports events